Orpheus Descending is a 1990 American television film starring Vanessa Redgrave and directed by Peter Hall. It is an adaptation of Tennessee Williams' play of the same name. Hall had directed Redgrave in  an acclaimed Broadway production of the play a year earlier. The stage actors such as Redgrave, Kevin Anderson and Brad Sullivan reprised their roles for the film.

Plot
Lady Torrance (Redgrave) is introduced as a disillusioned character; her Sicilian father was murdered by the Ku Klux Klan and she's been trapped in a miserable marriage for 20 years. Her tyrannical and bigoted husband is struck down by cancer.  Then Lady Torrance meets the orpheuse, a young man named Val Xavier (Kevin Anderson), an Elvis Presley-inspired drifter. A romantic entanglement ensues as Lady Torrance puts behind the misery of marriage behind her and tries to find passion and happiness with Val.

Cast
Vanessa Redgrave as Lady Torrance
Kevin Anderson as Val Xavier
Brad Sullivan as Jabe Torrance
Anne Twomey as Carol Cutrere
Miriam Margolyes as Vee Talbott
Sloane Shelton as Beulah Binnings
Patti Allison as Dolly Hamma
Manning Redwood as Sheriff Talbott
Pat McNamara as Pee Wee Binnings
Michael McCarty as Dog Hamma
Marcia Lewis as Nurse Porter

References

External links
 

1990 television films
1990 films
American films based on plays
Films directed by Peter Hall
Orpheus
TNT Network original films
Films based on works by Tennessee Williams
1990s English-language films